Heather Daly-Donofrio (born September 10, 1969) is an American professional golfer who played on the LPGA Tour.

Biography
Daly-Donofrio was born in Bridgeport, Connecticut. She played college golf at Yale University, graduating in 1991 with a degree in History. She turned professional in 1993.

Daly-Donofrio played on the Futures Tour from 1995 to 1997, winning three times.

Daly-Donofrio joined the LPGA Tour in 1998 and won twice, in 2001 and 2004.

Daly-Donofrio also coached the Yale University's women's golf team from 1997 to 2000 while playing full-time. She received the LPGA's William and Mousie Powell Award in 2005. She also served as president of the LPGA Tour Executive Committee in 2005 and 2006.

Professional wins (5)

LPGA Tour wins (2)

Futures Tour wins (3)
1995 Greater Lima Futures Open
1997 Ronald McDonald House Futures Classic, Quail Heights Futures Classic

References

External links

American female golfers
Yale Bulldogs women's golfers
LPGA Tour golfers
College golf coaches in the United States
Golfers from Connecticut
Yale Bulldogs coaches
Sportspeople from Bridgeport, Connecticut
Sportspeople from Fairfield, Connecticut
1969 births
Living people